The 1996 Women's World Weightlifting Championships were held in Warsaw, Poland from May 3 to May 11, 1996. There were 102 women in action from 24 nations.

Medal summary

Medal table
Ranking by Big (Total result) medals 

Ranking by all medals: Big (Total result) and Small (Snatch and Clean & Jerk)

Participating nations
102 competitors from 24 nations competed.

 (3)
 (1)
 (7)
 (3)
 (9)
 (9)
 (3)
 (3)
 (4)
 (4)
 (1)
 (1)
 (9)
 (6)
 (5)
 (2)
 (5)
 (1)
 (2)
 (8)
 (3)
 (3)
 (1)
 (9)

See also
 Weightlifting at the 1996 Summer Olympics

References
Results (Sport 123)
Weightlifting World Championships Seniors Statistics 

 
World Weightlifting Championships
World Weightlifting Championships
International weightlifting competitions hosted by Poland
World Weightlifting Championships